Zongxihe Bridgeis an arch bridge in Nayong County, Bijie, Guizhou, China. At , the bridge is one of the highest in world. The bridge is part of the new G56 Hangzhou–Ruili Expressway between Bijie and Liupanshui. The bridge crosses the Liuchong River.

See also 
List of highest bridges in the world
List of longest arch bridge spans

References

External links
http://www.highestbridges.com/wiki/index.php?title=Zongxihe_Bridge

Bridges in Guizhou
Arch bridges in China
Liuchong River
Bridges completed in 2015
Bijie